Mohammed Slim Chekili (born ) is a former Tunisian male volleyball player. He was part of the Tunisia men's national volleyball team. He competed with the national team at the 2004 Summer Olympics in Athens, Greece. He played with C.O. Kelibia in 2004.

Clubs
  C.O. Kelibia (2004)

See also
 Tunisia at the 2004 Summer Olympics

References

1985 births
Living people
Tunisian men's volleyball players
Place of birth missing (living people)
Volleyball players at the 2004 Summer Olympics
Olympic volleyball players of Tunisia